Mats Valk (born 4 May 1996) is a Dutch Rubik's Cube speedsolver. He broke the Rubik's cube single solve world record twice with times of 5.55 seconds in 2013 and 4.74 seconds in 2016. He won the Rubik's Cube European Championship in 2018 and was runner-up for 3x3x3 at the Rubik's Cube World Championships in 2013 and 2015.

Biography

Valk was born and raised in Amstelveen, the Netherlands, a suburb of the Dutch capital Amsterdam.

Valk is most famous for breaking the Rubik's cube world record twice and being the runner-up at both the Rubik's cube world championships of 2013 and 2015. He first broke the world record with a time of 5.55 seconds at the Zonhoven Open 2013 in Belgium on 3 March 2013. This record stood for over 2 years. He later broke the world record again with a time of 4.74 seconds at the Jawa Timur Open 2016 in Indonesia on 6 November 2016. In December 2016, Valk looked on as Feliks Zemdegs overtook his world record by just 0.01 seconds.

Valk has also set three 4x4x4 world records, two for single solve and one for an average of 5.  His second single world record, 26.77 seconds on 15 April 2012, was the first official 4x4x4 solve under 30 seconds. Altogether, Valk has broken 5 WCA world records, 17 European records, and 127 Dutch national records. Valk also currently holds the world record for solving the most Rubik's cubes in 1 hour, 374 cubes, set in Paris on 21 October 2015.

Valk is also known as a creator of the VLS (Valk Last Slot) 3x3x3 algorithm set, which correctly orients the last layer while inserting the last corner-edge pair of the first two layers. Valk used one of these algorithms to complete the cube in his 2016 3x3x3 world record.

The Valk 
Valk collaborated with the Chinese brand QiYi MoFangGe to set up his own brand, The Valk, creating cubes according to his own specifications. The design of the mechanism and the performance of the cube has to be approved by Valk himself before the cube is mass-produced and sold. The first cube released under this brand was the Valk 3 on 15 August 2016. This cube has been used by many other world-class speedcubers, including Patrick Ponce's former world record single. The size of the cube (5.55 cm each side) is a reference to his first Rubik's cube world record. He set his 2016 3x3x3 world record using a special magnetized version of this cube put together by TheCubicle.us, known as the Cubicle Valk 3 M. In 2018, QiYi released another Valk 3x3, the Valk Power and Power M, short for Valk Power Magnetic, the first copper core speedcube. Lastly, Qiyi released the newest Valk 3x3 called the Valk 3 Elite M. It has a dual magnet setting that no cube previously has had. The Valk Collection also has 2x2s, 4x4s, and a 5x5, all endorsed by Valk himself.

Records

External links 
 Mats Valk's Facebook page
 Mats Valk's Youtube channel
 Mats Valk's official results at World Cube Association

References 

1996 births
Living people
Dutch speedcubers
Sportspeople from Amstelveen